Lowell Gilmore (20 December 1906 – 31 January 1960) was an American stage, film and television actor.

Life and career 
Lowell Gilmore first worked as a stage manager on the 1929 Broadway play The First Mrs. Fraser, but got his chance as an actor when he replaced actor Eric Elliott in the play. This was the start to a successful Broadway career in the 1930s with plays like The Wind and the Rain (1934), The Taming of the Shrew (1935) and Leave Her to Heaven (1940). He made his film debut in Jacques Tourneur's war drama Days of Glory (1944) with Gregory Peck, where he was featured in an extensive role as Peck's second-in-command. His second film role was perhaps his most notable: As painter Basil Hallward in The Picture of Dorian Gray (1945), the film adaption of Oscar Wilde's literature classic. Another notable role was the District Commissioner in the Oscar-winning adventure film King Solomon's Mines (1950) with Stewart Granger and Deborah Kerr.

Although Gilmore was born in the United States, the "suave-looking, wavy-haired supporting actor" often portrayed British characters like doctors, officers, and gentlemen of rank. His roles were often dapper and sometimes also cads and villains. One of his best roles was probably as the Duke of Gloucester (the future Richard III) in The Black Arrow (1948), where he played him as a semi-sympathetic and charming, semi-villainous character. While his film roles got somewhat smaller in the 1950s, he played in numerous television series like Alfred Hitchcock Presents and The Jack Benny Program. Gilmore also appeared as Pontius Pilate in the television series The Living Christ Series (1951) and the film Day of Triumph (1954). He played his last role in 1958 and died two years later at the age of 53 years.

Filmography (without TV credits) 

 Days of Glory (1944) - Semyon
 The Picture of Dorian Gray (1945) - Basil Hallward
 Johnny Angel (1945) - Sam Angel
 Strange Conquest (1946) - Dr. Paul Harris
 Step by Step (1946) - Von Dorn
 The Arnelo Affair (1947) - Dr. Avery Border
 Calcutta (1947) - Eric Lasser
 The Prince of Thieves (1948) - Sir Phillip
 The Black Arrow (1948) - Duke of Gloucester
 Dream Girl (1948) - George Hand
 Walk a Crooked Mile (1948) - Dr. William Forrest
 The Secret Garden (1949) - British Officer
 Sword in the Desert (1949) - Maj. Stephens
 Fortunes of Captain Blood (1950) - George Fairfax
 Rogues of Sherwood Forest (1950) - Count of Flanders
 Tripoli (1950) - Lt. Tripp
 King Solomon's Mines (1950) - Eric Masters
 Darling, How Could You! (1951) - Aubrey Quayne
 The Highwayman (1951) - Oglethorpe
 Roadblock (1951) - Kendall Webb
 The Living Christ Series (1951) - Pontius Pilate
 Hong Kong (1952) - Danton
 Lone Star (1952) - Captain Elliott
 Plymouth Adventure (1952) - Edward Winslow
 Androcles and the Lion (1952) - Metellus
 Francis Covers the Big Town (1953) - Jefferson 'JG' Garnet
 Sailor of the King (1953) - Emissary of the King - USA version (uncredited)
 I Beheld His Glory (1953, TV Series) - Pontius Pilate
 Saskatchewan (1954) - Banks
 Day of Triumph (1954) - Pontius Pilate
 Ma and Pa Kettle at Waikiki (1955) - Robert Coates
 The Sea Chase (1955) - Captain Evans
 Blood Alley (1955) - British Officer (uncredited)
 Comanche (1956) - Commissioner Ward
 Jeanne Eagels (1957) - Rev. Davidson in 'Rain' (uncredited)

References

External links 
 
 

1906 births
1960 deaths
20th-century American male actors
American male film actors
American male stage actors
American male television actors